Ken Sanders may refer to:
 Ken Sanders (baseball)
 Ken Sanders (American football)
 Ken Sanders (book dealer)